Weekend is a 2010 Polish crime comedy film directed by Cezary Pazura, his directorial debut.

The plot revolves around two gangsters who are struggling for control of the city, who decide to track down and get hold of a suitcase filled with money and drugs. Meanwhile, another criminal gang has the same goal.

The film was shot and set in Łódź and released in the cinemas.

Critical reception was mostly negative, accused of being vulgar and low-brow.

Cast 

 Paweł Małaszyński – Max
 Małgorzata Socha 
 Michał Lewandowski – „Gula”
 Jan Frycz 
 Paweł Wilczak – Norman
 Piotr Miazga – Cygan
 Antoni Królikowski – Malinowski
 Radosław Pazura – Borys
 Tomasz Tyndyk – Johny
 Anna Karczmarczyk-Litwin – „Młoda"
 Olaf Lubaszenko – Czeski
 Tomasz Sapryk – Szasza
 Adrianna Biedrzyńska 
 Piotr Siejka
 Filip Bobek – playboy
 Ryszard Dreger – man I
 Mirosław Kropielnicki 
 Andrzej Andrzejewski – Stefan
 Krzysztof Pyziak – Cygan II
 Grzegorz Stelmaszewski – Cygan III
 Robert Martyniak – Cygan IV
 Waldemar Wilkołek – Łysy
 Bartłomiej Myca 
 Krzysztof Mika 
 Grzegorz Jurek
 Robert Brzeziński
 Kornelina Dzikowska
 Alicja Szopińska
 Jan Krzysztof Szczygieł
 Sławomir Sulej
 Michał Wójcik – Chemik
 Michał Szewczyk
 Agnieszka Jaskółka
 Amelia Radecka
 Norbert Kaczorowski
 Paweł Domagała 
 Błażej Pieczonka
 Mariusz Pilawski
 Magdalena Jaworska
 Marek Nędza
 Sławomir Małyszko – Bin Laden
 Paweł Pilszka
 Jacek Długosz 
 Tomasz Krzeminecki
 Tomasz Krzyżanowski
 Stefan Wójcicki 
 Krzysztof Sztabiński
 Piotr Dziarski

References

External links
Film Polski profile
Filmweb profile

2010s crime comedy films
2010 films
Polish crime comedy films
2010s Polish-language films
Films set in Poland
Films shot in Poland
2010 comedy films